Birds described in 1878 include Everett's white-eye, Pacific screech owl, Legge's hawk-eagle, Ochre-breasted pipit, Grey wren-warbler, Whistling fruit dove, Ashy-headed babbler, Scaly-breasted honeyeater, Fischer's turaco,

Events
Death of George Dawson Rowley

Publications
William Vincent Legge A history of the birds of Ceylon Published by the author [1878-1880] BHL  
Daniel Giraud Elliot On the Fruit-Pigeons of the Genus Ptilopus Proceedings of the Zoological Society of London.1878 500--575 London :Academic Press
Anton Reichenow and Gustav Mützel ,  Vogelbilder aus fernen Zonen [Pictures of Birds from Faraway Lands] Theodor Fischer, Kassel, Germany: 1878-83
George Ernest Shelley A Monograph of the Cinnyridae, or Family of Sun Birds (1878)
Ongoing events
John Gould The birds of Asia 1850-83 7 vols. 530 plates, Artists: J. Gould, H. C. Richter, W. Hart and J. Wolf; Lithographers:H. C. Richter and W. Hart
Henry Eeles Dresser and Richard Bowdler Sharpe  A History of the Birds of Europe, Including all the Species Inhabiting the Western Palearctic Region.Taylor & Francis of Fleet Street, London
José Vicente Barbosa du Bocage Ornithologie d'Angola. 2 volumes, 1877–1881.
The Ibis

References

Bird
Birding and ornithology by year